The 2016 South East Asian Women's U19 Volleyball Championships was held in Sisaket Province, Thailand, from 16 to 20 July 2016. Eight teams entered for this tournament.

Pools composition

Preliminary round 
All times are UTC+07:00.

Pool A 

|}

|}

Pool B 

|}

0000000

|}

Final round 
All times are UTC+07:00.

5th–8th semifinals 

|}

Semifinals 

|}

5th place 

|}

3rd place 

|}

Final 

|}

Final standing

Awards

Most Valuable Player
  Chatchu-on Moksri
Best Setter 
  Nguyen Thu Hoai
Best Outside Spikers 
  Wipawee Srithong 
  Chatchu-on Moksri

Best Middle Blockers 
  Luu Thi Hue 
  Tichakorn Boonlert
Best Opposite Spiker 
  Pimpichaya Kokram
Best Libero 
  Kathleen Faith Arado

References

External links
AVC official website
2016 in volleyball